Tumi Molekane (born 16 August 1981) is a Tanzanian-born South African rapper and poet. He was the lead vocalist of Tumi and the Volume, that was officially disbanded in 2012.  In 2016 Tumi relaunched himself as Stogie T and released an eponymous album titled  'Stogie T'  which featured Da L.E.S, Lastee, Emtee, Nasty C, Nadia Nakai & Yanga. He has 2 singles from the album. The first single "Diamond Walk" features rapper Nadia Nakai in the video. His second single from the album  By Any Means which features a hook and verses from Emtee and Yanga.

Background
Tumi and the Volume also comprises the members of the Mozambican band 340ml.

Molekane was born in Tanzania while his South African parents lived in exile there. In 1992 he repatriated to South Africa and took up residence in Soweto.

Music career

In 2005, Tumi recorded the song "Trade Winds" with Cincinnati-based rapper Main Flow. In 2006 he published his debut album, Music from My Good Eye, through his record label, Motif Records.

The album was later listed as one of the greatest South African albums of all time.

In 2006, he was published in the American literary journal The Subterranean Quarterly.

Tumi was also involved in the Dead Prez show around late in 2000 and also took part in the Black August tour to South Africa in 2001.

He has also performed with South African recording artists Blk Sonshine, Keorapetse Kgositsile, Watkin Tudor Jones, Lesego Rampolokeng. Saul Williams, Sarah Jones and Mutabaruka. He has also worked alongside Chinese Man, a French Hip-Hop crew, producing the album The Journey together in 2015.

In his book Stealing Empire: P2P, Intellectual Property and Hip-hop Subversion (2008), Professor Adam Haupt of the University of Cape Town analyzed the lyrics Molekane wrote for the Tumi and the Volume song "76", as well as others. Among Haupt's arguments are that contemporary hip hop music provides critical insights into the inheritance of violence in post-apartheid South Africa.

He contends that, despite commercial and often sexist imperatives in mainstream hip hop music, South Africa has produced a number of socially conscious hip hop artists, who are reluctant to compromise their art and political views. In 2016, he was featured on Ghanaian rapper M.anifest's album Nowhere Cool.
In 2018 Stogie released Honey and Pain, which is the follow up to his eponymous 2016 album. On 8 October 2021, he signed a record deal with Def Jam Africa, and was confirmed by Def Jam Africa on 12 January 2022.

In 2022, Tumi performed at a World Intellectual Property Day event at the headquarters of the World Intellectual Property Organization in Geneva, Switzerland. In an interview with WIPO Magazine, Tumi said "I tell every 18-year old who wants to rap that if they spend just one hour understanding what music publishing is, what IP is, what royalties are, and what their rights are, they will do more for their music than the three hours they spend on YouTube figuring out how to mix a new drum pattern. The entry barrier to music is virtually nonexistent now because of technology. That makes musicians vulnerable and means they need to be IP savvy."

In sharing his views on how musicians can monetize their work, he said "streaming is like a business card; it's a way to get people familiar with your music while you take advantage of other channels to make money."

References

External links

1981 births
Living people
South African rappers
Tanzanian poets
Tanzanian rappers
21st-century Tanzanian male singers